Edgar Daniel Núñez Ortíz (born 23 August 1979), is a Honduran football striker.

Club career
Núñez played 71 matches in the Honduran national league, scoring 17 goals while playing for Atlético Olanchano, Real España, Marathón and Vida. He joined Deportes Savio for the 2008 Apertura season.

Núñez and compatriot Elkin González were injured in a car accident when playing for Guatemalan side Deportivo Xinabajul.

International career
Núñez made his debut for Honduras in a June 2005 friendly match against Jamaica and has earned a total of 2 caps, scoring no goals. He was a non-playing squad member at the 2005 CONCACAF Gold Cup.

His final international was a July 2005 friendly match against Canada.

References

External links
 

1979 births
Living people
Association football forwards
Honduran footballers
Honduras international footballers
2005 CONCACAF Gold Cup players
Real C.D. España players
C.D. Marathón players
C.D.S. Vida players
Atlético Olanchano players
Deportes Savio players
Liga Nacional de Fútbol Profesional de Honduras players
Honduran expatriate footballers
Expatriate footballers in Guatemala